Sumak kawsay is a neologism in Quechua created in the 1990s by socialist-indigenous organizations. Originally created as a political and cultural proposal, Ecuadorian and Bolivian governments later adopted it. The term refers to the implementation of a socialism that moves away from Western socialist theory and instead embraces the ancestral, communitarian knowledge and lifestyle of Quechua people. In Ecuador, it has been translated as buen vivir or "good living", although experts in the Quechua language agree that a more precise translation would be "the plentiful life". In Bolivia, the original word in Aimaran is suma qamaña which has been translated as vivir bien or living well.

In the original Quechua phrase, sumak refers to the ideal and beautiful fulfillment of the planet, and kawsay means "life," a life with dignity, plenitude, balance, and harmony. Similar ideas exist in other indigenous communities, such as the Mapuche (Chile), the Guaraní (Bolivia and Paraguay), the Achuar (Ecuadorian Amazon), the Guna (Panamá), etc. 

Mayan Tsotsil and Tseltal peoples pursue Lekil Kuxlejal (a fair-dignified life), which is considered equivalent to Buen Vivir and has influenced the development Neozapatismo.

Since the 1990s, sumak kawsay has grown into a political project that aims to achieve collective wellbeing, social responsibility in how people relate to nature, and a halt to endless capital accumulation. This final aspect makes the project an alternative to traditional development. Buen vivir proposes the collective realization of a harmonious and balanced life based on ethical values, in place of a development model that views human beings as an economic resource. Indigenous movements in Ecuador and Bolivia, along with intellectuals, initially used the concept to define an alternative paradigm to capitalist development with cosmological, holistic, and political dimensions. The 2008 Constitution of Ecuador incorporated the concept of the rights of nature, as did the 2009 Constitution of Bolivia. Diverse theorists, such as economists Alberto Acosta and Magdalena León, say that sumak kawsay is not about a finished and completely structured theory, but rather an unfinished social proposal that can be improved.

Principles of sumak kawsay 
The Andean philosopher Javier Lajo understands sumak kawsay as thinking well and feeling well in order to do well, with the ultimate goal of achieving harmony with the community, family, Nature, and universe. The ancestral sumak kawsay considers people as part of the Pachamama or Mother Earth. Unlike other paradigms, the modern buen vivir, inspired by indigenous traditions, looks for balance with Nature in the fulfillment of needs instead of mere economic growth.

Sumak kawsay is a paradigm based on five pillars:
 There is no life without knowledge or wisdom (Tucu Yachay)
 We all come from Mother Earth (Pacha Mama)
 Life is healthy (hambi kawsay)
 Life is collective (sumak kamaña)
 We all have an aspiration or a dream (Hatun Muskuy)
Sumak kawsay, in the Andean conception, is the balance between feeling well (Allin Munay) and thinking well (Allin Yachay) which results in doing well (Allin Ruay) in order to achieve harmony, as explained by Lajo.

This principle, rooted in the Andean indigenous cosmovision and ancestral knowledge in general, is based on:

 Relationality, which refers to the interconnection among all elements in a whole
 Reciprocity, which has to do with the reciprocal relationship between the worlds above, below, now, between human beings and nature, a sort of co-participation
 Connection, which refers to how the elements of reality connect to each in a harmonious, proportional way
Sumak kawsay, living well, or splendid existence clashes with the idea of infinite progress. Pachamama or Mother Nature has a limit, which prevents unlimited development and growth at the cost of "the other"—nature, which includes human beings. Having a harmonious relationship requires re-knowing and applying complementarity and cooperation, not accumulation.

Sumak kawsay contemplates a harmonious relationship with society, which is understood as a wide, globalized sphere, and the field of the dominant culture and system. With this, the concept seeks to recreate and apply interculturality and plurinationality, fundamental precepts to this proposed way of life.

History 
Researchers say it is difficult to trace the concept's use, but many agree that the theoretical and political proposal gained traction in the 1990s. In Ecuador, indigenous movements emerged in full force and created a series of internal, educational initiatives and international cooperation programs that promoted the principles of good living. In Bolivia, suma qamaña appeared because of the work of indigenous movements and intellectual, leftist groups.

According to the sociologist Guadalupe Rivadeneira, the concept of sumak kawsay has always existed. However, Amazonian Kichwas with the Pastaza Indigenous Peoples' Organization (OPIP) recently systematized the concept in 1994.

Definitions 
As a pluralistic concept, buen vivir has a variety of definitions. Eduardo Gudynas outlines eight core ideas for the concept: 1) create space for sharing critiques of development, 2) uplift ethical outlooks grounded in values, 3) center decolonization, 4) foster intercultural dialogue, 5) deny the nature–society binary, 6) reject manipulative and instrumental rationalities, 7) reject linear understanding of progress and 8) express feelings and affections. Overall, Gudynas endorses buen vivir as a framework for moving beyond modernity and development.

David Choquehuanca explains that living well or good living is living in harmony with other human beings and with nature, on the basis of unity, solidarity, and empathy. As such, it is a return to the ancestral principles of the region's peoples. This perspective is not anthropocentric or even egocentric: everyone, including nature, forms part of the same whole. In this way, buen vivir is a search for life in community, where all members look after each other. The most important part is that life is meant in a broad sense, and not focused on individuals or property. Such a cosmovision requires renouncing any type of accumulation.

According to Luis Macas, Quechua lawyer and ex-president of CONAIE, sumak is plenitude. It is the sublime, excellent, magnificent, beautiful, and superior. Kawsay is life. It is the state of being, but it is dynamic, variable, and active. Therefore, sumak kawsay is life in plenitude. Life is material and spiritual excellence. For the Indigenous Peoples or Original Nations, this concept comes from thousands of years of experience, just like resistance among Original Nations. Therefore, this concept does not emerge by coincidence, nor does it originate in the codification of rights of nature in 2008 Constitution of Ecuador. Sumak kawsay comes from communal life; it is the essence of that system and explains the daily practices of indigenous communities. It is vital to their civil organization, and even has continued despite the violent interruption of colonialism and the aggression of capitalism.

See also
 Indigenous peoples in Bolivia
 Indigenous peoples in Ecuador
 Law of the Rights of Mother Earth, passed in Bolivia in 2010
 Quechua people

References

Quechua
Ecuador
Bolivia
1990s neologisms
Socialism of the 21st century